CSI Institute of Technology (CSIIT), known as CSI Engineering College, is an engineering institution located in Thovalai, Kanyakumari, Tamil Nadu, India. CSI Institute of Technology is a Christian Minority Institution, established in 1995 by the Church of South India (C.S.I), Kanyakumari Diocese. The college is certified to ISO 9001:2000 standard.

Academic programs
CSIIT offers undergraduate degrees in engineering in the following:
 B.E. Computer Science and Engineering
 B.E. Electrical & Electronics Engineering
 B.E. Electronics and Communication Engineering
 B.E. Mechanical Engineering
 B.E. Civil Engineering
 B.Tech. Information Technology

CSIIT offers Masters degrees in the following:
 M.E. Manufacturing Engineering
 M.E. Power Electronics & Drives Engineering
 M.E. Communication System Engineering
 M.E. Computer Science and Engineering
 M.E. Structural Engineering
 M.E. Applied Electronics
 M.E. Computer and Communication Engineering
 M.C.A. Master of Computer Applications
 M.B.A Master of Business Administration

Corporate relationship
The college has tie ups with corporate industries and MNCs like:
 Microsoft India, Bangalore
 Intel India, Bangalore
 AmadaSoft India, Bangalore
 National Instruments
 Agilent Technologies
 Altera Corporation
 Freescale Semiconductors
 Tata Consultancy Services, Bangalore
 Wipro Technologies
 Infosys Technologies
 Cognizant Technologies Ltd.
 HCL, Chennai

See also
List of Colleges in Kanyakumari District

References

External links
CSI Institute of Technology official website

Christian universities and colleges in India
All India Council for Technical Education
Engineering colleges in Tamil Nadu
Universities and colleges in Kanyakumari district